Irwin Abraham Meltzer Hyman (March 22, 1935 – February 7, 2005) was an American school psychologist known for his research on, and opposition to, corporal punishment of children.

Early life and education
Hyman was born on March 22, 1935 in Neptune, New Jersey. He received his B.A. from the University of Maine in 1958, followed by a M.Ed. in 1961 and Ed.D. in 1964, both from Rutgers University.

Career
Hyman worked at the Vineland Training School (then known as the American Institute for Mental Studies) as chief of clinical services from 1966 to 1967. He then briefly taught at Newark State College before joining the faculty of Temple University in 1968. He was initially an associate professor of school psychology at Temple, and in 1975, he was named a full professor there, a position he held until his death. At Temple, he founded the National Center for the Study of Corporal Punishment and Alternatives in the Schools, after his research found evidence of negative effects of corporal punishment on children. He also served as director of the Center.

Honors and awards
In 1999, Hyman received the Award for Distinguished Contributions to the Science and Profession of Psychology from the Pennsylvania Psychological Association. In 2002, he received the Legends in School Psychology Award from the National Association of School Psychologists.

Personal life and death
Hyman died in Philadelphia, Pennsylvania, on February 7, 2005.

References

1935 births
2005 deaths
20th-century American psychologists
Educational psychologists
People from Neptune Township, New Jersey
University of Maine alumni
Rutgers University alumni
Temple University faculty